Nuwan Sanjeewa (born Athukoralage Nuwan Sanjeewa on 1 June 1978) was a Sri Lankan cricketer. He was a right-handed batsman and right-arm bowler who played for Sri Lanka Air Force Sports Club. He was born in Colombo.

Sanjeewa made a single first-class appearance for the side, during the 2000–01 season, against Moors Sports Club. He scored 9 runs in the first innings from the middle order, and, when switched to the opening order in the second innings, scored 20 runs.

External links
Nuwan Sanjeewa at Cricket Archive 

1978 births
Living people
Sri Lankan cricketers
Sri Lanka Air Force Sports Club cricketers
Cricketers from Colombo